Jay Joyner is an American college basketball coach and former head coach for the North Carolina A&T Aggies men's basketball team.

Playing career
Joyner played college basketball at South Carolina State under Cy Alexander, and was a part of the Bulldogs 1996 NCAA tournament squad. After college he played for the CB 1939 Canarias in Spain's Liga ACB, but retired due to nagging knee problems and his first child on the way.

Coaching career
Joyner's college coaching career began under Alexander at Tennessee State, where he served as an assistant coach. He'd then move on to assistant coaching jobs at Columbia State, Rutgers, and Cumberland before returning to Columbia State as head coach. In three seasons with the Chargers, he compiled a 61-23 record and two Tennessee Junior and Community College Athletic Association regular season titles.

When Alexander was named the head coach at North Carolina A&T, Joyner joined his staff as an assistant coach. He was elevated to the head coaching position on March 7, 2016 after Alexander resigned. Joyner was suspended indefinitely as head coach on December 27, 2019 for undisclosed reasons.  NC A&T State University stated that the issue was a "personnel matter" and would not comment further until the issue was resolved. Joyner was replaced by associate head coach Willie Jones as head coach.

Head coaching record

College

‡ Cy Alexander resigned January 29, 2016; Joyner coached rest of season.

References

External links
 North Carolina A&T profile

Living people
American expatriate basketball people in Spain
American men's basketball coaches
American men's basketball players
Basketball coaches from New York (state)
Basketball players from New York (state)
CB Canarias players
Cumberland Phoenix men's basketball coaches
High school basketball coaches in the United States
Junior college men's basketball coaches in the United States
North Carolina A&T Aggies men's basketball coaches
People from Amityville, New York
Rutgers Scarlet Knights men's basketball coaches
South Carolina State Bulldogs basketball players
Sportspeople from Suffolk County, New York
Tennessee State Tigers basketball coaches
Year of birth missing (living people)